Clavaria argillacea is a species of fungus in the family Clavariaceae.

Clavariaceae
Fungi of Europe